Hassan Idriss Dicko (Arabic:حسن إدريس ديكو) (born 1 January 1985) in Senegal) is a Qatari born-Senegalese footballer. He currently plays for Al-Shamal.

External links

References

Senegalese footballers
Qatari footballers
1985 births
Living people
El Jaish SC players
Al-Wakrah SC players
Al-Sailiya SC players
Al-Shamal SC players
Senegalese emigrants to Qatar
Naturalised citizens of Qatar
Qatari people of Senegalese descent
Qatar Stars League players
Qatari Second Division players
Association football goalkeepers